Jablonski Rico Noel (born January 11, 1989) is an American professional baseball outfielder who is a free agent. He previously played in Major League Baseball (MLB) for the New York Yankees in 2015.

Amateur career
Noel attended Lawton High School in Lawton, Oklahoma, where he started for the baseball, basketball, and American football teams. Deciding to pursue baseball over football, Noel enrolled at Coastal Carolina University to play college baseball for the Coastal Carolina Chanticleers. He began his college career as a second baseman, but became a center fielder in his sophomore year. In 2009, he played collegiate summer baseball with the Cotuit Kettleers of the Cape Cod Baseball League.

Professional career

San Diego Padres
The San Diego Padres selected Noel in the fifth round of the 2010 MLB Draft. Noel signed with the Padres, receiving a $163,000 signing bonus. In 2012, while playing for the Lake Elsinore Storm of the Class A-Advanced California League, Noel recorded 90 stolen bases. Noel was named All-MiLB for May 2013. He began the 2015 season in Triple-A with the Padres, but asked for his release when he decided that to further his career, he needed to play for another organization.

New York Yankees
The Padres released Noel in July, and he signed with the Yankees.

The Yankees promoted Noel to the major leagues on September 1, 2015. He made his major league debut as a defensive replacement on September 2. After the Yankees clinched a berth in the MLB postseason, Noel received his first plate appearance on October 3, and hit a single off of Baltimore Orioles' pitcher Oliver Drake. Noel was included on the Yankees' 25-man roster for the 2015 American League Wild Card Game. Noel stole five bases for the Yankees. The Yankees removed Noel from their 40-man roster over the offseason.

Los Angeles Dodgers
Noel signed a minor league contract with the Los Angeles Dodgers in December 2015. He was given a non-roster invitation to Dodgers spring training. He played in 47 games with the Triple-A Oklahoma City Dodgers, hitting .230.

Lancaster Barnstormers
Noel signed with the Lancaster Barnstormers of the Atlantic League of Professional Baseball for the 2017 season. he was released on May 6, 2017. He resigned on May 23, 2017.

Houston Astros
On August 1, 2017, Noel signed a minor league contract with the Houston Astros. He was assigned to the Corpus Christi Hooks of the Class AA Texas League. He elected free agency on November 6, 2017.

Return to Lancaster
On March 12, 2018, Noel signed with the Lancaster Barnstormers of the Atlantic League of Professional Baseball for the 2018 season. He became a free agent following the 2018 season.

Leones de Yucatán
On May 9, 2019, Noel signed with the Leones de Yucatán of the Mexican League. He was released on June 8, 2019.

Sugar Land Skeeters
On July 12, 2019, Noel signed with the Sugar Land Skeeters of the Atlantic League of Professional Baseball. He became a free agent following the season.

Sultanes de Monterrey
On April 18, 2022, Noel signed with the Sultanes de Monterrey of the Mexican League. He was released on May 11, 2022.

El Águila de Veracruz
On May 14, 2022, Noel signed with El Águila de Veracruz of the Mexican League. He was released on July 13, 2022.

Personal life
Noel was born in Louisiana to Vincent and Mary Noel. His family moved to Oklahoma when he was in junior high school. Noel lives in Myrtle Beach, South Carolina, during the baseball offseason. Noel's younger brother, Orlandus, is seeking a heart transplant.

References

External links

1989 births
Living people
African-American baseball players
American expatriate baseball players in Mexico
Arizona League Dodgers players
Baseball players from Louisiana
Baseball players from Oklahoma
Bravos de León players
Criollos de Caguas players
Coastal Carolina Chanticleers baseball players
Corpus Christi Hooks players
Cotuit Kettleers players
El Águila de Veracruz players
El Paso Chihuahuas players
Eugene Emeralds players
Fort Wayne TinCaps players
Fresno Grizzlies players
Lake Elsinore Storm players
Lancaster Barnstormers players
Leones de Yucatán players
Leones del Caracas players
American expatriate baseball players in Venezuela
Liga de Béisbol Profesional Roberto Clemente outfielders
Major League Baseball right fielders
Mexican League baseball center fielders
New York Yankees players
Oklahoma City Dodgers players
People from Ville Platte, Louisiana
People from Lawton, Oklahoma
San Antonio Missions players
Scranton/Wilkes-Barre RailRiders players
Sultanes de Monterrey players
Tomateros de Culiacán players
Trenton Thunder players
21st-century African-American sportspeople
20th-century African-American people